York Lodge, also known as Bittersweet, is a historic home and national historic district located at Cazenovia in Madison County, New York. The district contains six contributing buildings and one contributing site. The main house, which was built about 1904, is an eclectic mansion with features reflecting a combination of the then popular Jacobethan Revival, Georgian Revival, and Shingle Styles.  It is a -story, L-shaped, frame dwelling built as a summer residence.  It features a 2-story, semi-circular sleeping porch with shingled piers and a conical roof.  Also on the property is a gazebo, carriage house, gardener's cottage, garage, and two work sheds.

It was added to the National Register of Historic Places in 1991.

References

Houses on the National Register of Historic Places in New York (state)
Historic districts on the National Register of Historic Places in New York (state)
Gothic Revival architecture in New York (state)
Colonial Revival architecture in New York (state)
Houses completed in 1904
Houses in Madison County, New York
National Register of Historic Places in Cazenovia, New York